This is a list of prefects of Bjelovar-Bilogora County.

Prefects of Bjelovar-Bilogora County (1993–present)

See also
Bjelovar-Bilogora County

Notes

External links
World Statesmen - Bjelovar-Bilogora County

Bjelovar-Bilogora County